Legacy of Lies is a 2020 film written and directed by Adrian Bol and starring Scott Adkins.

Plot
A decade ago, agent Martin Baxter quit MI6 after his wife's tragic murder in an operation gone wrong. But when journalist Sasha, asks for help solving an old case, Martin finds himself in the crosshairs of both UK and Russian intelligence. With his daughter held captive by the KGB, Martin has just 24 hours to deliver the secret case files — which means risking both Sasha's life and his own.

Cast
 Scott Adkins as Martin Baxter
 Anna Butkevich as Tatyana
 Honor Kneafsey as Lisa Baxter
 Matt Mitler as Mark Ramley
 Marco Robinson as Burns
 Yuliia Sobol as Sasha Stepanenko
 Andrea Vasiliou as Suzanne
 Martin McDougall as Trevor 
 Jeffrey Welch as President of the United States

Background
Entrepreneur Marco Robinson and Adrian Bol met in 2015, with the same goal of making a spy thriller feature film.

Marco Robinson was originally cast as the lead role in Legacy of Lies and a trailer was produced which secured over $700,000 in funding from the Ukrainian State Film Agency as the top prizewinner. This enabled Bol and Robinson to collaborate with Toy Cinema to make the film.

To secure further investment, Robinson (who also stars in the film as an MI6 agent) and Bol sought to cast a big name to fill the lead role. After a year long search, Scott Adkins signed onto the project, saying he loved the script, the eastern European locations and the film noir themes.

The film was shot in London and Kyiv.

Post-production finished in December 2019, though due to the COVID-19 pandemic, Legacy of Lies could not be premiered in theatres.

The movie was held back from release until February 2021, when the rights were sold to Netflix UK. The film reached number four in the charts and stayed there for many weeks. In October 2021, Netflix USA bought the rights and the film debuted at number two.

Reception
The film has received multiple wins and nominations in several categories including winner of the Best British Feature at the London Independent Film Festival awards. It was the winner of the Hollywood Art and Movie Award and won the Festival Award at the Edinburgh Independent Film Awards.

Adrian Bol was voted Best Director at the Barcelona Planet Film Festival 2021.

Legacy of Lies has a rating of 86% on Rotten Tomatoes.

References

External links
 

2020 films
American spy action films
American spy thriller films
British spy action films
British spy thriller films
Films postponed due to the COVID-19 pandemic
Films not released in theaters due to the COVID-19 pandemic
2020s English-language films
2020s American films
2020s British films